The Departmental Council of Lozère is the deliberative assembly of the department of Lozère in the region of Occitanie. It consists of 26 members (general councilors) from 13 cantons and its headquarters are in Mende.

The President of the General Council is Sophie Pantel.

Vice-Presidents 
The President of the Departmental Council is assisted by 7 vice-presidents chosen from among the departmental advisers. Each of them has a delegation of authority.

See also 

 Lozère
 General councils of France

References

External links 

 

Lozère
Lozère